Zoran Marušić (born 29 November 1993) is a Serbian footballer who plays for Uzbekistan Super League club Navbahor Namangan.

Club career

Sloga Kraljevo

2010–11 season
Born in Kraljevo, Marušić made his first football steps in football school "Bambi" in his home town. Later he moved to Sloga Kraljevo, where he passed all youth categories. Marušić joined the first team and made his first senior appearances for Sloga in the 2010–11 Serbian League West season, after which Sloga returned in the Serbian First League. During the season, Marušić made 6 appearances.

2011–12 season
During the first half of 2011–12 Serbian First League season, Marušić was mostly played with youth team and did not make any appearances for the first team. At the beginning of the spring half-season, Marušić was used as a back-up player several times, but after solid games and injuries of some standard players, Marušić also started 9 matches on the field. He usually played as a defensive midfielder, but he also appeared as a centre-back sometimes. He collected 13 caps at total, scoring 1 goal.

2012–13 season
After Boban Dmitrović's and Rašo Babić's retirements, Marušić started the 2012–13 Serbian First League season as a centre-back, pairing with Nemanja Miletić. During the first half season, Sloga have many problems in defense, because of insufficient experienced players and a lot of goals conceded. New coach, Neško Milovanović brought Nenad Živanović for the second half-season, who played 7 matches, and then he left the club because of private causes, so Marušić returned on the stopper place. However, he injured before the end of season, Stefan Drašković replaced him in defense line. Marušić collected 28 league and 1 cup appearances for the season.

2013–14 season
Making solid performances in previous season, Stefan Drašković continued playing as a centre-back, along with Nemanja Miletić. Coach Veljko Dovedan moved Marušić in midfield, but players with more experience had advantage and Marušić started season as back-up player after he recovered an injury. He was starting matches from the bench at the beginning of season, and adopted in starting 11 after Miloš Janićijević's injury, but he injured in shortly time again. Previously, he scored 5 goals on two matches. Marušić and Janićijević had also many injury problems almost the whole season. However, he scored 2 more goals until the end of first half-season, Marušić became one of the most effective players for that autumn in the Serbian First League. He is one of the most responsible for all 7 home victories of Sloga Kraljevo in first half-season. Marušić had the dispute with club at the beginning of 2014, when he requested a contract breaking. After his request was denied as groundless, he apologized to teammates and supporters and returned in the first team squad in 4th spring fixture. Later he played the whole matches until the end of season, 8 times as starter and 4 times he entered game from the bench. He noted 22 First League appearances, scoring 7 goals, and also played a cup match against Vojvodina.

2014–15 season

Loaning to Voždovac
After Sloga's permission to all players for leaving the club, Marušić moved on loan to the Serbian SuperLiga side Voždovac along with Dragoljub Anđelković. He acquired condition to play in 3rd fixture of the 2014–15 season, against Rad, when he was substituted in for Ognjen Damnjanović on the beginning of second half. After his SuperLiga debut, he also started next match, against Čukarički. He left the club in the winter break off-season.

Return to Sloga Kraljevo
In January 2015 Marušić and Dragoljub Anđelković returned to Sloga Sloga. Marušić was related with Napredak Kruševac, in the winter break off-season, but he did not sign with the club. He started the second half-season as one of the most experienced players in the club, but he injured in 3rd spring fixture, and he did not play until 22 fixture, against Moravac Mrštane, when he scored a goal from direct free kick. He was in starting 11 in next fixture against Radnik Surdulica, when he renewed an injury and was substituted out during the first-half. Because of many injury problems, Marušić noted just 5 matches for Sloga in the 2014–15 Serbian First League season and scored 1 goal.

2015–16 season
After the club relegated from the Serbian First League, Marušić started the 2015–16 season in Serbian League West, missing some matches including a cup match against Mokra Gora because of recovering an injury. During the first half-season, Marušić noted 10 appearances and scored 1 goal in the 15th fixture match against Mihajlovac 1934. In the winter break off-season, Marušić left the club and spent some period on trial with Zlaté Moravce. Previously, he was also training with the same club during the summer pre-season.

Slavija / Krupa
At the beginning of 2016, Marušić joined by Slavija Sarajevo recommendation by Veljko Dovedan's recommendation, who trained him as a coach of Sloga Kraljevo. Playing for the club, Marušić made 7 appearances in Premier League of Bosnia and Herzegovina, scoring 1 goal in away match against Borac Banja Luka.

In summer 2016, Marušić was related with Borac Banja Luka, but he started training with new Premier League club Krupa. During the first half of 2016–17 season, Marušić noted 10 league matches for that club with just 1 start, scoring a goal in a match against Sarajevo. He also played a Bosnian Cup match against Travnik. After the end of first half-season, Marušić terminated the contract and left club.

BSK Borča
At the beginning of 2017, Marušić joined BSK Borča, but was not licensed with the club until April same year. He made his first appearance for the club 21 fixture match of the 2016–17 Serbian First League season, against Bežanija. He collected 9 appearances at total for the club until the end of a season. Next the club relegated to the Serbian League Belgrade, Marušić left as a free agent.

Temnić
In summer 2017, Marušić joined new First League club Temnić. Passing the complete pre-season with the club, he was ordered to playing in the first squad. Marušić scored his first goal for new club in the first fixture of the 2017–18 Serbian First League season for 1–0 victory over Radnički Pirot.

Dinamo Tbilisi
On 15 January 2021, he signed a 2-year contract with Dinamo Tbilisi.

Career statistics

References

External links
 Zoran Marušić stats at utakmica.rs 
 
 

1993 births
Living people
Sportspeople from Kraljevo
Association football midfielders
Serbian footballers
Serbian expatriate footballers
Expatriate footballers in Bosnia and Herzegovina
Expatriate footballers in Belarus
Expatriate footballers in Georgia (country)
Expatriate footballers in Uzbekistan
Serbian First League players
Serbian SuperLiga players
Premier League of Bosnia and Herzegovina players
FK Sloga Kraljevo players
FK Voždovac players
FK Slavija Sarajevo players
FK Krupa players
FK BSK Borča players
FK Temnić players
FK Sloboda Užice players
FC Dnyapro Mogilev players
FC Neman Grodno players
FC Dinamo Tbilisi players
Navbahor Namangan players